Kalymnios is a Greek surname Καλυμνιός. Notable people with the surname include:

Alex Kalymnios, English director, producer, and screenwriter
Konstantinos Kalymnios (born 1977), Australian lawyer, writer of Greek descent

See also
Kalymnos, a Greek island

Greek-language surnames